Matt Garvey (born 23 October 1987) is an English former rugby union player. He attended Ortu Gable Hall School completing his secondary school education there. He played as a second row who could also can play in the back row. He played for London Irish, Bath, Gloucester and Worcester Warriors as well as representing the England Saxons team.

References 
 
 
 
 

1987 births
Living people
Bath Rugby players
English rugby union players
London Irish players
Rugby union locks
Rugby union players from Thurrock
Rugby union flankers